Kimberly Jo Zimmer (born February 2, 1955) is an American actress, best known for her role as Reva Shayne on the CBS soap opera Guiding Light. For this portrayal, she has won four Daytime Emmy Awards for Outstanding Lead Actress in a Drama Series.

Career
Zimmer's career began with stage work; an early television role was her portrayal of the character of Bonnie Harmon on One Life to Live in 1978. In 1979, she was tapped to replace Kathleen Turner as Nola Dancy Aldrich on The Doctors. She later appeared opposite Turner in the 1981 film Body Heat  in a plot that addressed similarities in their appearance. For much of her stint, she was the show's leading lady, but left the show in July 1982 on a maternity leave, escorted off the show by her real life husband, A.C. Weary, who played Nola's newest conquest. She would return one last time later in the year for the funeral of her former mother-in-law, Mona Croft. She had a brief return to One Life to Live from February through November 1983 as Echo DiSavoy.

In 1983, Zimmer was cast in the role for which she is best known, the character of Reva Shayne on the television soap opera Guiding Light. Her portrayal of Reva was a focus of the show until Zimmer left in 1990. She returned to Guiding Light in April 1995 and portrayed Reva until the show's conclusion in September 2009. While Zimmer's Reva was paired with several leading men, her work with Robert Newman (Josh) earned them the label of "supercouple."

Zimmer left Guiding Light in July 1990 and moved to the West Coast for five years, during which she played Jodie DeWitt Walker on Santa Barbara from 1992 to 1993. In 1995, Zimmer appeared in an episode of Seinfeld ("The Diplomat's Club"), as Mr. Pitt's attorney, who suspected Elaine and Jerry were trying to kill Mr. Pitt.

In 2010, Zimmer returned to the role of Echo on One Life to Live. Zimmer was featured in a story along with former Guiding Light co-star Jerry verDorn (Clint Buchanan), Robin Strasser (Dorian Cramer) and Erika Slezak (Viki Lord).

Zimmer has also appeared in several episodic television programs, including Designing Women, MacGyver, Models, Inc., and Babylon 5 (episode "And Now For a Word", year 1995). She also appeared in several made-for-television movies.

Zimmer has starred in a number of theater roles, including several at Augusta's Barn Theatre. In 2011, it was announced that Zimmer would be cast in the Off-Broadway international hit Love, Loss, and What I Wore. She starred as Mrs. Hayes in Connecticut Repertory Theatre's production of Odysseus D.O.A., running through March 4, 2012. Zimmer made her musical theatre debut when she joined the first North American tour of Broadway's Wicked. She played the role of Madame Morrible from 14 August 2012 through 13 December 2013. Zimmer returned to the role with the first North American tour on 30 September 2014. Zimmer has also appeared in several productions of the musical Gypsy, first in 2006 at the Barn Theatre in Augusta, Michigan, and in 2015 at the Pittsburgh Civic Light Opera opposite former Guiding Light leading man Robert Newman.

In 2011 she released her memoir called  I'm Just Sayin'!: Three Deaths, Seven Husbands and a Clone! My Life as a Daytime Diva.

In 2023, after several years off-screen, Zimmer returned to acting starring in the drama film You Sing Louder, I Sing Louder starring opposite Ewan McGregor and her son Jake Weary.

Personal life
Zimmer was born in Grand Rapids, Michigan, the daughter of Burdina Elva (known as "Dede") Zimmer and Walter Jack Zimmer. She has an older sister Karen Ann Zimmer (Mrs. Witzel). She graduated from Forest Hills Central High School in Ada Township, which is just east of Grand Rapids, and then studied at Hope College in Holland, Michigan, and at American Conservatory Theater in San Francisco.  She is married to actor/director A.C. Weary (Allen Cudney Weary), and they have three children: Rachel, Max, and Jake Weary. Jake is also an actor; he appeared on As the World Turns as Luke Snyder in 2005, and has had various guest roles, including on Law and Order: Special Victims Unit and currently stars as Deran Cody in Animal Kingdom. She resides in Montclair, New Jersey

Filmography

References

External links
 
 

1955 births
Living people
20th-century American actresses
21st-century American actresses
American stage actresses
American television actresses
American soap opera actresses
Daytime Emmy Award winners
Daytime Emmy Award for Outstanding Lead Actress in a Drama Series winners
Actresses from Grand Rapids, Michigan
Hope College alumni
American Conservatory Theater alumni